North Hykeham is a town and civil parish in the North Kesteven district, in the county of Lincolnshire, England. It forms part of the Lincoln Urban Area. The population of the town at the 2011 census was 13,884.

History
North Hykeham was originally spelt "North Hyckham", and is commonly referred to as just 'Hykeham'.

North Hykeham is independent from Lincoln, despite being contiguous with the city and its surrounding areas. The old village dates back to the Angles, Germanic invaders who occupied much of Britain after the Romans left in 400 AD. The Danes and Vikings arrived in Lincolnshire in 900 AD, hence places with names ending in –by, thorpe and ham (which mean ‘village’).

The Domesday Book (1086) records that North Hykeham had 15 households and a 52-acre meadow. The tenant-in-chief was Baldwin of Flanders.

The windmills featured on the town crest are a reference to the two ancient windmills that once stood in the town, with each being owned by one of the two manors. The first mill was of a brick-built construction and was part of 'Ladds Mill' which was located on what is now known as Mill Lane (hence the name).

North Hykeham Church was first mentioned in 1160 but, by 1535 it was a 'free chapel', and by 1700 a ruin. From 1700 there was no church in North Hykeham. All Saints Church, consisting of nave, south aisle, chancel and tower, was erected on a new site in 1868, at a cost of £1200. A Methodist Chapel was built in 1881. In 1894 the first Parish Council was established and met in the village school. In 1948 the Parish Council moved to the Memorial Hall ('The Tin Tabernacle') on Newark Road. The present Memorial Hall was built in 1969. In May 2006 the Town Council moved to its new premises in Fen Lane, an extension of an existing pavilion.

Geography 
North Hykeham lies south-southwest of Lincoln. It neighbors South Hykeham, Bracebridge Heath, Thorpe-on-the-Hill and the Lincoln suburb of Birchwood. North Hykeham is also the only other town in the North Kesteven District (along with Sleaford). The boundary with Lincoln/North Hykeham starts at Doddington Road and Triton Road.

Governance
North Hykeham is in the district of North Kesteven and has its own local town council on Fen Lane. It falls within the Sleaford and North Hykeham parliamentary constituency. The MP for the seat since 2016 has been the Conservative Caroline Johnson.

Economy
An Asda superstore opened in 1969, and was subsequently rebuilt on land adjacent to the old store (previously the site of Hykeham Manor, partial ruins of which existed into the early 1980s) which was demolished, and is part of the current larger, 24 hour store car park in March 1998. It is situated on Newark Road towards the district boundary (Tritton Road - B1003) with the City of Lincoln. There is a Co-op store near the junction of Lincoln Road, Mill Lane, and Moor Lane, with a small group of shops and medical practice. Most of the local shops in the town are on Newark Road at a shopping centre called "The Forum".

The Lindum Group have a site on Station Road which houses several businesses comprising the Lindum Group and a number of other businesses, some of which are closely associated with the group. ASC Metals make metal sheets and tubes. There are engineering companies on Freeman Road, near the railway station, including Siemens (formerly Alstom Power). A foundry, Lincoln Castings, on Station Road closed in February 2007; the last owners were the Meade Corporation of Malmesbury.

There is a sailing club on Apex Lake (formed from a former sand and gravel pit). Nearby is Whisby Nature Park. The Lincolnshire Road Transport Museum is on Whisby Road near the railway station.

On the Westminster Trading Estate on Station Road, there is a practice studio for musicians.

There is a memorial to those who lost their lives in both The First and Second World Wars.

Facilities

Public houses
The town's public houses are The Fox and Hounds, The Centurion, The Harrows and The Lincoln Green.

Churches 

The Hykeham ecclesiastical parish lies south of the town and includes St Hugh's Anglican church, built in the 1960s, on Harewood Crescent and the Victorian gothic-style All Saints Anglican church on the corner of Moor Lane. Both are part of the Hykeham Team Ministry which incorporates the church in South Hykeham. A Methodist chapel is situated on Chapel Lane. In January 2014, a new church opened at the Sir Robert Pattinson Academy known as 'Alive Hykeham'.

Parks 

North Hykeham has five parks. Glebe Park is behind the Lincoln Green public house. Fen Lane Park has football pitches, a children's play area and a purpose-built skatepark. "The Green" park is part of the old village green, and The Memorial Hall park is part of the Memorial Hall sporting facilities. St Aidan's Park contains an old orchard.

Education
There are two secondary schools: North Kesteven Academy and the Sir Robert Pattinson Academy, adjacent on Moor Lane. The Terry O'Toole Theatre and NK Sports Centre are at North Kesteven Academy. There are also several primary schools including All Saints CE, Fosse Way Academy, Manor Farm Academy and Ling Moor Primary

Sport
North Hykeham is home to various sports clubs including:
 North Hykeham Rugby Union Club, who play at the Memorial Hall & Playing Fields Association pitch on Newark Road;
 Lincolnshire Bombers, a British American football team, who also play at the Memorial Hall;
 North Hykeham Sailing Club, is home to various competitions and boating days. They are located off Newark Road in a former gravel pit lake;
 Greenbank FC, the biggest junior football club in the county;
 Lincoln & District Runners, an amateur running and walking club, who meet each Tuesday at NK leisure centre at 19:20 (except for the first Tuesday of each month where other locations are used). Their most famous runner is Louis Sime, who is local legend on many Strava routes, and a veteran of two marathons.

Twinning
  Denzlingen (since 1988), north of Freiburg in Baden-Württemberg (13,500 population)

References

External links

 Town Council
 The Library
 Hykeham Team Ministry
 History of the parishes of North and South Hykeham
 

Towns in Lincolnshire
Civil parishes in Lincolnshire
North Kesteven District
Areas of Lincoln, England